Johnny Key (born 18 October 2003) is a Samoan athlete who has represented Samoa at the Pacific Mini Games and Commonwealth Games.

Key is from Lepea and was educated at St Josephs College.

At the 2022 Pacific Mini Games in Saipan, Northern Mariana Islands he won bronze in the 100 metres, silver in the 4 × 100 metres relay, and bronze in the 4 × 400 metres relay.

On 14 July 2022 he was selected as part of Samoa's team for the 2022 Commonwealth Games in Birmingham.

References

Living people
2003 births
People from Tuamasaga
Samoan male sprinters
Commonwealth Games competitors for Samoa
21st-century Samoan people